In November 2015, Turkish Security Forces launched the siege of Silvan - an operation and a curfew in the city of Silvan, directed against the PKK-affiliated group YDG-H.  The curfew was started on 3 November and lifted on 14 November 2015.

Background
On October 2, 2015, the Turkish military raided Silvan with the support of artillery. The YDG-H dug trenches and justified their resistance to the Turkish Government with the atrocities the Kurdish people has suffered under the rule of the Turkish Government which still refuses to acknowledge certain rights of the Kurds.

Curefew 
The curfew began on the 3 November 2015 and lasted until the 14 November. During that time the military and police forces conducted anti-terror operations in the three neighborhoods of Konak, Mescit and Tekel. The Turkish military deployed helicopters and tanks against the town, and locals complained that its 90,000 residents were low on food, water and electricity.

Casualties
At least 7 people had been killed in the siege as of November 11, 2015, including 2 civilians and a police man. Its Mayor Kerem Canpolaten mentioned that 11'000 inhabitants of the town had left due to the fighting.

See also
Kurdistan
Kurds in Turkey
Kurdish people

References

Kurdish–Turkish conflict (2015–present)
2015 in Turkey